Crompton Smith better known as Tommy Smith (16 October 1937 in Middleburg, Virginia – 5 March 2013 in Upperco, Maryland) was an American jockey. He is best remembered as the first American jockey  to win the prestigious Grand National steeplechase race while riding a horse born and trained in the United States. He accomplished the feat in 1965 with Jay Trump. A few months later, the same horse-jockey combination finished third in another important race: the Grand Steeple-Chase de Paris. Other notable wins by the pair includes three victories in the Maryland Hunt Cup (1963, 1964 and 1966). In 1965, Smith appeared on the April 26th episode of the CBS game show To Tell the Truth. 
Despite considerable success, Smith quit jockeying in 1966 and began a career in the health-care industry.
After his retirement in 1995, Smith moved to Maryland and started training thoroughbreds. Unfortunately, a riding accident in 2001 left him a quadriplegic. He died in 2013.

References

Bibliography
The will to win : the true story of Tommy Smith and Jay Trump. Jane McIlvaine McClary (1966). 

1937 births
2013 deaths
American jockeys
People from Middleburg, Virginia